Sreekrishnapuram Assembly constituency was one of the 140 state legislative assembly constituencies in Kerala state in southern India, before the 2008 delimitation of constituencies. Previously, it was also one of the state legislative assembly constituencies included in the Palakkad Lok Sabha constituency.

History
Sreekrishnapuram constituency was formed in 1965. C. Govinda Panicker was first elected MLA from the constituency. Constituency was delimitated in 2008. After the delimitation, Vellinezhi Panchayat and Cherpulassery Municipality which were in the old Sreekrishnapuram constituency became part of Shornur Assembly constituency and Kadampazhipuram, Karimpuzha and Sreekrishnapuram panchayats became part of Ottapalam Assembly constituency.

Members of Legislative Assembly
The following list contains all members of Kerala legislative assembly who have represented the constituency:

Key

References 

Former assembly constituencies of Kerala